"Beauty Queen" is a song by Australian alternative/punk rock band Lash. It was released in August 2001 as the group's second single from their album, The Beautiful and the Damned (2002). The song peaked at number 31 on the ARIA charts. The song also appears on the soundtrack, Freaky Friday, for the 2003 Disney film of the same name, along with "Take Me Away", covered by actress Christina Vidal.

Tracklisting

 "Beauty Queen" (Jessica Bennett, Andrew Klippel, Barry Palmer, Micaela Slayford, Belinda Reid, Jaclyn Pearson) – 3:45
 "Beauty Queen" (Illpickl's Bump & Grind mix)
 "Take Me Away"

Charts

Release history

References 

2001 singles
2001 songs
Australian pop songs
Songs written by Andrew Klippel